McMahon Islands are two low, peaked, rocky islands,  north of the Thala Hills, Enderby Land. Plotted from Australian National Antarctic Research Expeditions (ANARE) air photos taken in 1956 and visited by the Australian National Antarctic Research Expeditions (ANARE) (Thala Dan) in February, 1961. Named by ANCA for F.P. McMahon, Supply Officer, Antarctic Division, Melbourne, and second-in-command of the Australian National Antarctic Research Expeditions (ANARE) (Thala Dan), 1960–61.

See also 
 Composite Antarctic Gazetteer
 List of Antarctic islands south of 60° S
 SCAR
 Territorial claims in Antarctica

References

External links

Islands of Enderby Land